David Fundisile Bese is a South African politician who has represented the African National Congress (ANC) in the Eastern Cape Provincial Legislature since 2019. He was elected to his seat in the 2019 general election, ranked 23rd on the ANC's provincial party list. He holds a PhD in sustainable agriculture from the University of the Free State and chairs the legislature's Portfolio Committee on Rural Development and Agrarian Reform.

References

External links 

 

African National Congress politicians
Living people
Year of birth missing (living people)
Members of the Eastern Cape Provincial Legislature
21st-century South African politicians
University of the Free State alumni